Narestan (also Romanized as Nārestān) is a village in Kuh Hamayi Rural District, Rud Ab District, Sabzevar County, Razavi Khorasan Province, Iran. At the 2006 census, its population was 38, in 11 families.

References 

Populated places in Sabzevar County